Queen Jeonghyeon (정현왕후 윤씨) (21 July 1462 – 13 September 1530), of the Papyeong Yun clan, was a posthumous name bestowed to the wife and third queen consort of Yi Hyeol, King Seongjong and the mother of Yi Yeok, King Jungjong. She was queen consort of Joseon from 1479 until her husband's death in 1495, after which she was honoured as Queen Dowager Jasun (자순왕대비).

Life 
Yun Chang-nyeon (윤창년, 尹昌年) was born on 21 July 1462 into the Paepyeong Yun clan to Yun Bo and his wife, Lady Jeon of the Damyang Jeon clan as their second child. On her father’s side, one of her 6th cousins (육촌오빠) was Yun Pil-sang (윤필상, 尹弼商), Internal Prince Papyeong (파평부원군, 坡平府院君) (1427 – 1504). Through her father, Royal Consort Hee-bi of the Papyeong Yun clan, a consort of King Chunghye of Goryeo, and Queen Jeonghui, a Queen Consort of King Sejo, are her ascendants. 

She was elected deliberately when her father Yun-ho served as a high position in 1473, and was rebuked as a queen in 1479 after the demise of Queen Yun (the mother of Yeongsangun). It is argued that she helped to bring Queen Yun’s demise along with her father Yun Ho and her 6th cousin, Yun Pil-sang. But it is unknown how much Queen Jeonghyeon, who was 17 years old at the time, was involved in the abolition of the now deposed Queen Yun. Since it’s speculated that 18-year-old Queen Jeongsun was also behind it, it could be said that the probability is sufficient. 

She gave birth to Grand Prince Jinseong and three princesses; Princess Suksun, and two unnamed princesses who died prematurely. Formerly, Yun was one of Seongjong's concubines, instated in 1473 with Suk-ui rank.

But she was then selected as the third queen consort of Seongjong on 8 November 1480.

Seongjong's first wife, Queen Gonghye of the Cheongju Han clan, and Yejong’s first wife, Queen Jangsun of the Cheongju Han clan, were also first cousins thrice removed of Queen Jeonghyeon. Queen Jeonghyeon's great-grandmother, Lady Han of the Cheongju Han clan, is the daughter of Han Sang-jil, and a paternal aunt of one of King Sejo's close associates, Han Myeong-hoe; making them first cousins twice removed.

Afterwards, with the resuscitation of Queen Yun, Yeosangun, grew up knowing Queen Jeonghyeon as his birth mother. In 1493, when writing the tombstone of Seongjong and his head, somebody learned of Yun's private affairs and provided the cause of the massacre of the Sarim faction through sudden death. But in 1494, the young king eventually learned of what had happened to his biological mother and attempted to posthumously restore her titles and position. 

In 1497, during Yeosangun’s third year of reign, she received the honor of Jasun (慈 順) and Hwahye (和 惠) in 1504 for her posthumous title. In 1506, during a revolt, the leading forces of the anti-government advocated the establishment of Grand Prince Jinseong (later King Jungjong) on the throne and consented.

The Queen consort died on 13 December 1530 at the age of 68 within Gyeongbok Palace’s Dong Palace.

She is buried in Seonreung (Gangnam, Seoul, South Korea) with her husband and his first wife, Queen Gonghye.

Family
Parent

 Uncle - Yun Oh (윤오, 尹塢)
 Uncle - Yun Dang (윤당, 尹塘)
 Father − Yun Ho (1424 – 9 April 1496) (윤호, 尹壕)
 Uncle - Yun Hae (윤해, 尹垓)
 Uncle - Yun Tan (윤탄, 尹坦)
 Uncle - Yun Pa (윤파, 尹坡)
 1) Grandfather − Yun Sam-San (1406 – 1457) (윤삼산, 尹三山) 
 2) Great-Grandfather − Yun Geun (윤곤, 尹坤) (? - 11 March 1422)
 3) Great-Great-Grandfather − Yun Seung-sun (윤승순, 尹承順) (? - 1392)
 4) Great-Great-Great-Grandfather − Yun Cheok (윤척, 尹陟) (? - 1384)
 5) Great-Great-Great-Great-Grandfather − Yun Ahn-suk (윤안숙, 尹安淑)
 6) Great-Great-Great-Great-Great-Grandfather − Yun Bo (윤보, 尹珤) (? - 1329)
 7) Great-Great-Great-Great-Great-Great-Grandfather −Yun Sun (윤순, 尹純)
 8) Great-Great-Great-Great-Great-Great-Great-Grandfather − Yun Bok-won (윤복원, 尹復元)
 9) Great-Great-Great-Great-Great-Great-Great-Great-Grandfather − Yun Sang-gye (윤상계, 尹商季) (? - 1201)
 7) Great-Great-Great-Great-Great-Great-Grandmother − Lady Yi
 6) Great-Great-Great-Great-Great-Grandmother − Lady Park
 4) Great-Great-Great-Grandmother − Lady Yi
 3) Great-Great-Grandmother − Lady Yi of the Danyang Yi clan (단양 이씨)
 2) Great-Grandmother − Lady Han of the Cheongju Han clan (청주 한씨); Yun Geun’s second wife
 1) Grandmother − Lady Lee of the Goseong Lee clan (고성 이씨)
 Mother − Internal Princess Consort Yeonan of the Damyang Jeon clan (연안부부인 담양 전씨, 延安府夫人 潭陽 田氏) (1421 - 1500)
 1) Grandfather − Jeon Jwa-Myeong (1424 – 1521) (전좌명, 田佐命)
 1) Grandmother − Lady Yi of the Jeonju Yi clan (전주 이씨)

Sibling

 Older brother − Yun Eun-ro (윤은로, 尹殷老)
 Younger brother − Yun Tang-ro (윤탕로, 尹湯老) (1466 - 5 June 1508). Wife: Lady Yi of the Jeonju Yi clan (전주 이씨) (? - 29 June 1509)
 Nephew − Yun Jin (윤진, 尹珍) (24 November 1498 - 23 February 1543). Wives: (a) Lady Kim of the Gwangsan Kim clan (광산 김씨, 光山 金氏) (b) Lady Hong of the Namyang Hong clan (남양 홍씨) (1505 - 1587)
 Grandniece — Lady Yun of the Papyeong Yun clan (파평 윤씨
 Grandnephew − Yun Yoo-geun (윤유곤, 尹裕昆) (3 March 1526 - 21 January 1549). Wife: Lady Yi of the Jeonju Yi clan (전주 이씨) (1528 - 18 October 1590)
 Grandniece − Lady Yun of the Papyeong Yun clan (파평 윤씨). Husband: Han Gyeong-sang (한경상, 韓景祥)
 Grandnephew − Yun Yu-hu (윤유후, 尹裕後) (11 January 1541 - 13 August 1606)
 Niece − Lady of the Papyeong Yun clan (파평 윤씨). Husband: Yi Chang-in (이창인, 李昌仁) of the Jeonju Yi clan
 Grandnephew − Yi Suk (이숙, 李淑)
 Half-nephew − Yun Seok (윤석, 尹錫)
 Half-nephew − Yun Nan-dong (윤난동, 尹蘭同)
 Half-niece − Lady Yun of the Papyeong Yun clan (파평 윤씨). Husband: Kim Won-seok (김원석, 金元錫)

Consort

 Yi Hyeol, King Seongjong (20 August 1457 – 20 January 1494) (조선 성종)
 Father-in-law − King Deokjong (덕종대왕, 德宗大王) (3 October 1438 - 20 September 1457) 
 Legal father-in-law - Yi Hwang, King Yejong (조선 예종) (14 January 1450 - 31 December 1469)
 Mother-in-law − Queen Sohye of the Cheongju Han clan (소혜왕후 청주 한씨, 昭惠王后 淸州 韓氏) (7 October 1437 - 11 May 1504) 
 Legal mother-in-law - Queen Jangsun of the Cheongju Han clan (장순왕후 한씨) (2 February 1445 - 5 January 1462)

Children

 Adoptive son − Yi Yung, King Yeonsan (연산군, 燕山君) (23 November 1476 - 20 November 1506)
 Daughter − Princess Sunsuk (1478 – 14 July 1488) (순숙공주)
 Unnamed daughter (1485 - 1486)
 Son − Yi Yeok, King Jungjong (16 April 1488 – 29 November 1544) (조선 중종)
 Daughter-in-law - Queen Dangyeong of the Geochang Shin clan (단경왕후 신씨) (7 February 1487 - 27 December 1557) — No issue.
 Daughter-in-law - Queen Janggyeong of the Paepyeong Yun clan (장경왕후 윤씨) (10 August 1491 - 16 March 1515)
 Granddaughter - Princess Hyohye (13 June 1511 – 6 May 1531) (효혜공주)
 Grandson - Yi Ho, King Injong (10 March 1515 – 7 August 1545) (조선 인종)
 Daughter-in-law - Queen Munjeong of the Paepyeong Yun clan (문정왕후 윤씨) (2 December 1501 – 5 May 1565)
 Granddaughter - Yi Ok-hye (이옥혜, 李玉蕙), Princess Uihye (의혜공주) (1521 – 1564)
 Granddaughter - Yi Ok-rin (이옥린, 李玉麟), Princess Hyosun (효순공주) (1522 - 1538)
 Granddaughter - Yi Ok-hyeon (이옥현, 李玉賢), Princess Gyeonghyeon (경현공주) (1530 - 1584)
 Grandson - Yi Hwan, King Myeongjong (조선 명종) (3 July 1534 - 2 August 1567)
 Granddaughter - Princess Insun (인순공주) (1542 - 1545)
 Unnamed daughter (1490 - 1490)

See also 
 Royal Consort Hee-bi of the Papyeong Yun clan - a consort of King Chunghye of Goryeo and Jeonghyeon’s ascendant
 Queen Jeonghui - an ascendant through her father 
 Queen Janggyeong - a descendant through her father
 Yun Im - older brother of Queen Janggyeong and a descendant through her father
 Queen Munjeong - an descendant through her father
 Yun Won-hyeong  - Queen Munjeong’s younger brother and descendant through her father

In popular culture
 Portrayed by Ban Hyo-jung in the 1988 film Diary of King Yeonsan.
 Portrayed by Park Young-gwi in the 1995 KBS TV series Jang Nok-su.
 Portrayed by Kim Ja-ok in the 1996 KBS TV series Jo Gwang-jo.
 Portrayed by Yoon Ji-sook in the 1998-2000 KBS TV series The King and the Queen.
 Portrayed by Lee Bo-hee in the 2001-2000 SBS TV series Ladies in the Palace.
Portrayed by Eom Yoo-shin in the 2003-2004 MBC TV series Dae Jang Geum.
 Portrayed by Lee Jin in the 2007-2008 SBS TV series The King and I.
 Portrayed by Do Ji-won in the 2017 KBS2 TV series Queen for Seven Days.

Notes

1462 births
1530 deaths
Royal consorts of the Joseon dynasty
Korean queens consort
15th-century Korean women
Papyeong Yun clan